The 2004 World Outdoor Bowls Championship men's triples was held at the Northfield Bowls Complex in Ayr, Scotland, from 23 July to 7 August 2004.

Jim McIntyre, Willie Wood and David Peacock of Scotland won the gold medal.

Qualifying round
Four sections, three teams from each section qualify for the championship round.

Section 1

Section 2

Section 3

Section 4

Championship round

Section 1

Section 2

Bronze medal match
England beat Ireland 23–10.

Gold medal match
Scotland beat New Zealand 15–11.

Results

References

Men